Commander Henry Alexander Stuart-Menteth,  (26 August 1912 – 14 May 2000) was a British naval officer famous for his service in the Royal Navy, particularly during the Second World War where he assisted in the sinking of two U-boats and helped capture Enigma code fragments, which enabled Bletchley Park to decipher the code. He commanded six ships during his career. He married in 1952, having two sons and a daughter, and seven grandchildren in turn.

Stuart-Menteth was born as one of four. He joined a navy cadet force in Devon, serving on several ships. After his promotion course, he served both abroad and in the United Kingdom. He joined  shortly before the Second World War. His ship was torpedoed after a raid on a German-held port in April 1940. He was kept in a hospital by the Germans, and was listed at home as killed in action. When the British liberated the area, he was freed. On his next ship, he helped capture Enigma code fragments, which enabled Bletchley Park to decipher the code. In the same year he was given his first command, . He was mentioned in despatches in 1942, while working on  after the ship sunk a U-boat, and a Distinguished Service Cross for sinking another U-boat. Stuart-Menteth was entrusted to the Royal Australian Navy in 1949, where he commanded two destroyers. He ran the Scottish Corps of Commissionaires for 20 years after his 1958 retirement.

Early life

Henry Alexander Stuart-Menteth, often abbreviated to Alex Stuart-Menteth, was born on 26 August 1912 in Merstham, Surrey. He was the son of Walter Stuart-Menteth and Violet Stuart-Menteth (née Lafone), one of four: Walter Granville Stuart-Menteth (1906 – 1970), Frances Bevyl Stuart-Menteth (1907 – 1957), and Lucy Violet Stuart-Menteth (1911 – ). In 1926, he became a cadet in Dartmouth, Devon. With the cadets, he served on the ships  in the Atlantic,  in the West Indies and America, and on the shore establishment HMS President on his promotion course.

Naval career

Second World War
On 28 August 1939, shortly before the outbreak of the Second World War, Stuart-Menteth joined the destroyer . Hunter was in Captain Bernard Warburton-Lee's 2nd Flotilla, along with four other destroyers. On 10 April 1940, in a snowstorm, the Flotilla attacked the port of Narvik, held by the Germans. Four German destroyers were sunk and seven damaged, notably sinking , an 8,500-ton ship transporting ammunition. Hunter was set alight and torpedoed, leading to her sinking. As she sank, Stuart-Menteth was trapped by a malfunctioning davit with a leg wound on the upper deck. A rating saved Stuart-Menteth, and they were both picked up by German sailors.

Stuart-Menteth was taken to Narvik, at a civilian hospital. He remained in the town until its eventual liberation by the Allies. However, whilst he was in hospital, Stuart-Menteth was listed as killed in action, and had an obituary in The Times as such, which he later read. After further hospitalisation in Britain from April to December 1940, on 3 December Stuart-Menteth became the first lieutenant of the Tribal-class destroyer . She partook in Operation Claymore, an operation to disrupt supplies, to ferry commandoes to shore, and to capture German code. Somalia brought to a stop Krebs, a German trawler, by firing at her, forcing her to stop. A boarding party found cryptographic keys and rotor machines. This assisted Bletchley Park to decipher several Enigma codes.

In May 1941, Stuart-Menteth again assisted the capture of Enigma material from the German ship München, enabling Bletchley Park to begin to decipher German Enigma codes. Several months later, he was given command of his first ship, a Hunt-class destroyer. He was mentioned in despatches on 2 June 1943 as "Lieutenant-Commander Henry Alexander Stuart-Menteth, Royal Navy"; after commanding Aldenham in a disastrous mission in the Aegean Sea.

After the war

He went on to work with Lord Mountbatten in Malta, and in 1958 he retired, moving to Scotland. He did, however, operate the Scottish Corps of Commissionaires for close to 20 years, and was chairman of the Edinburgh World Wildlife Fund for 10 years.

Personal life
Stuart-Menteth met Penelope Giles in 1952 in Australia, the couple married, having a daughter and two sons: Andrew Alexander (1954), Walter Henry (1957), and Harriet Lucy (1959); and seven grandchildren. He died on 14 May 2000 in Edinburgh, Lothian.

References

1912 births
2000 deaths
Enigma machine
People from Surrey (before 1965)
Recipients of the Distinguished Service Cross (United Kingdom)
Royal Navy officers of World War II
Royal Australian Navy officers